The year 2009 in architecture involved some significant architectural events and new buildings.

Events
March 3 – Historical Archive of the City of Cologne (1971) collapses.
April 6 – 2009 L'Aquila earthquake in Italy; dome of Santa Maria di Collemaggio collapses for the second time.
May 26 – Construction work at Louvre Abu Dhabi officially begins.
October 21 – Solomon R. Guggenheim Museum in New York City celebrates its 50th anniversary (after a three-year restoration effort).
November – The second World Architecture Festival is held in Barcelona. 
Burj Khalifa is set to open several different times in 2009, and ultimately postponed until 2010.
The Russia Tower gets cancelled due to unknown reasons.
PLP Architecture founded in London.

Buildings and structures

Buildings opened

January – Embassy of the United States, Baghdad, the largest and most expensive embassy in the world, opens.
January 17 – Copenhagen Concert Hall, designed by Jean Nouvel, opens.
January 31 – Porsche Museum, Stuttgart, designed by Delugan Meissl Associated Architects, opens.
February 15 – Princess Elisabeth Antarctica, inaugurated.
February 22 – Alice Tully Hall at Lincoln Center in New York City reopens after major renovations by Diller Scofidio + Renfro.
March 7 – Our Lady of the Most Holy Trinity Chapel at Thomas Aquinas College, Santa Paula, California, designed by Duncan G. Stroik, is dedicated.
March 14 – New Cardiff Central Library in St. David's, Cardiff, Wales, designed by Building Design Partnership, opens to the public.
April 2 – New Yankee Stadium, home of the New York Yankees baseball team in the Bronx, designed by Populous (formerly HOK Sport), opens.
April 13 – Citi Field, new home of the New York Mets baseball team in Queens, opens.
April 25 – Prada Transformer building in Seoul, South Korea, designed by Rem Koolhaas, opens.
April 30 – 300 New Jersey Avenue office building on the mall in Washington, D.C., designed by British architects Rogers Stirk Harbour + Partners, opens.

May 21 – Museum Brandhorst in Munich, designed by Sauerbruch Hutton, opens.
June 8 – First segment of the High Line Park in Chelsea, Manhattan opens.
June 12 – Hafod Eryri at the summit of Snowdon in Wales, designed by Ray Hole Architects, is opened.
June 21 – New Acropolis Museum in Athens, designed by Bernard Tschumi with Michael Photiadis, opens to the public.
July – New Sarawak State Legislative Assembly Building in Kuching, Malaysia, officially opened.
August 4 – The Knut Hamsun Centre in Hamarøy, Norway, designed by Steven Holl, opens.
August 15 – 41 Cooper Square, the new Cooper Union academic building in New York City, designed by Thom Mayne, has its opening ceremony.
September 9 – Herning Museum of Contemporary Art, Denmark, new building designed by American architect Steven Holl, opens.

September 18 – Liège-Guillemins railway station in Belgium, designed by Santiago Calatrava, has its opening ceremony.
September 29 – Manitoba Hydro Place in downtown Winnipeg, designed by Kuwabara Payne McKenna Blumberg Architects of Toronto, opens.
October 16 – Extensive interior reconstruction of the Neues Museum, Berlin, to the designs of David Chipperfield, is officially opened.
November 7 – Extensive three-year internal rebuild and expansion of the Ashmolean Museum, Oxford, to the designs of Rick Mather, is completed.
November 14 – Centre for Contemporary Art Nottingham (gallery) in Nottingham, England, designed by Caruso St John, opens.
December – Jamieson Place (Calgary) in Calgary, Alberta
December 5 – Mandarin Oriental, Las Vegas, part of the CityCenter complex in Paradise, Nevada, opens.
December 16 – The CityCenter urban complex in Paradise, Nevada, designed by Ehrenkrantz, Eckstut & Kuhn Architects, opens.
date unknown – Jacob und Wilhelm Grimm-Zentrum library at Humboldt University of Berlin, designed by Max Dudler.

Buildings completed
May 21 – Stanbrook Abbey, Wass, North Yorkshire, England, first stage, designed by Feilden Clegg Bradley Studios.
May 27 – Cowboys Stadium, new home of the Dallas Cowboys football team, designed by HKS.
October 21 – Soccer City (FNB Stadium) in Johannesburg, South Africa, host to the 2010 FIFA World Cup.
November – MAXXI - National Museum of the 21st Century Arts in Rome, Italy, designed by Zaha Hadid.
November 1 – Yas Hotel Abu Dhabi in the Yas Marina Circuit, Abu Dhabi, designed by Asymptote Architecture of New York.
December 27 – Darunaman Mosque in northern Thailand.
date unknown
The Cathedral of the Annunciation in Voronezh, Russia.
Legacy Tower, Chicago, designed by Solomon, Cordwell, Buenz.
The Tower, Meridian Quay, Swansea, Wales, designed by Latitude Architects.
Punta della Dogana art museum in Venice, restored by Tadao Ando.
Woodward's Building in Vancouver, Canada.
Bateman's Row (home and studio) in Shoreditch, London, designed for themselves by Theis + Khan Architects.
Buildings in Spain designed by Alberto Campo Baeza
"Between Cathedrals", Cádiz.
MA Museum, Granada.
Rufo House, Toledo.

Awards
AIA Gold Medal – Glenn Murcutt (Australia)
Alvar Aalto Medal – Tegnestuen Vandkunsten
Architecture Firm Award – Olson Kundig Architects
Driehaus Architecture Prize – Abdel-Wahed El-Wakil 
Grand Prix de l'urbanisme – François Ascher
Emporis Skyscraper Award – Aqua
European Union Prize for Contemporary Architecture (Mies van der Rohe Prize) – Snøhetta
Lawrence Israel Prize - Gaetano Pesce
Praemium Imperiale Architecture Award – Zaha Hadid
Pritzker Prize – Peter Zumthor
 RAIA Gold Medal – Ken Maher
RIBA Royal Gold Medal – Álvaro Siza Vieira
Stirling Prize – Rogers Stirk Harbour + Partners
Thomas Jefferson Medal in Architecture – Robert Irwin.
Twenty-five Year Award – Faneuil Hall Marketplace
Vincent Scully Prize – Christopher Alexander

Births

Deaths
January 14 – Jan Kaplický, Czech architect (born 1937)
February 3 – Earl Flansburgh, Boston architect (born 1931)
February 23 – Sverre Fehn, Norwegian architect (born 1924)
July 9 – H. T. Cadbury-Brown, English architect (born 1913) 
July 15 – Julius Shulman, California architectural photographer (born 1910)
August 3 – Charles Gwathmey, American architect (born 1938) 
August 16 – Mualla Eyüboğlu, one of the first female Turkish architects  (born 1919)
November 27 – Maxwell M. Kalman, Québécois architect (born 1906)
December 8 – Claude Vasconi, French architect (born 1940)

See also
Timeline of architecture

References 

 
21st-century architecture